El Goli, also called Shah Goli is a large historic park (or garden) in the south east region of Tabriz, Iran. One of its main features is its large artificial lake, measuring 210 meters/700 ft square.

History and characteristics

Tradition dates the construction of the park to the late 18th century. However, it may have been built earlier as well; some sources suggest as far back as the 14th century. In the Qajar period the park was restored and high terraces were added.

The northern side of the lake was built up, which, according to Penelope Hobhouse, makes the lake "appear to float over the valley". A causeway leads out to a pavilion, today the site of a restaurant. The pavilion was once crowned with a dome. From the west hillside, a spring feeds the lake, a cascade descending in five terraces. The sight is flanked by poplar trees and willows.

Etymology
The park was first named Shah Goli (Shah Gölü), the "Royal Lake" or the "Royal Pond". After the Islamic Revolution of 1979, the park and the surrounding were renamed as El Gölü, "lake of the people".

Photo gallery

See also
 Khaqani Park
 Golestan Park

References

Sources

External links 

 City of Tabriz on Iran Chamber Society (www.iranchamber.com)
 Editorial Board, East Azarbaijan Geography, Iranian Ministry of Education, 2000 (High School Text Book in Persian)
 https://web.archive.org/web/20070216155119/http://www.tabrizcity.org/
 Tishineh

Parks in Tabriz
Architecture in Iran
Buildings and structures in Tabriz
Persian gardens in Iran
National works of Iran